The 2020 Summer Paralympics women's tournament in Tokyo began on 25 August and ended on the 4 September 2021. The matches were played at the Musashino Forest Sport Plaza and the Ariake Arena. This was the fourteenth edition of the tournament since the tournament debut at the 1968 Summer Paralympics in Tel Aviv.

Ten teams were separated into two groups of five with the top four qualifying through to the knockout stage of the competition. The knockout stage started from the quarter-finals and ended with the gold medal match, aside from the classification matches.

Competition schedule

Qualification
Ten teams qualified through the qualifying stage with the host nation in Japan. The other nine spots were spread out across four different events. Four spots was taken up by European teams, two by the Americas and Asia/Pacific and one in Africa.

Squads

Preliminary round

Group A

Group B

Knockout stage

Bracket

9th–10th classification playoff

Quarter-finals

7th–8th classification playoff

5th–6th classification playoff

Semi-finals

Bronze medal match

Gold medal match

Rankings

References

Women
International women's basketball competitions hosted by Japan
2021 in women's basketball